The Boogeyman is an upcoming American supernatural horror film directed by Rob Savage from a screenplay by Scott Beck, Bryan Woods and Mark Heyman, based on the 1973 short story of the same name by Stephen King. The film stars Madison Hu, Vivien Lyra Blair, Sophie Thatcher, David Dastmalchian, Chris Messina, and Jaynie Verdin. 

Principal photography began in February 2022 in New Orleans.  Originally planned to be released on the streaming service Hulu, The Boogeyman is scheduled to be released theatrically in the United States on June 2, 2023, by 20th Century Studios.

Premise
High school student Sadie Harper and her little sister Sawyer are still reeling from the recent death of their mother. Devastated by his own pain, their father Will, a therapist by profession, gives them neither the support nor the affection that they try to claim from him. When a desperate patient shows up unexpectedly at their house asking for help, they bring in a terrifying entity that preys on the families and feeds on their greatest suffering.

Cast
 Chris Messina as Will
 Vivien Lyra Blair as Sawyer
 Sophie Thatcher as Sadie
 David Dastmalchian as Lester
 Marin Ireland as Rita
 Madison Hu

Production
The Boogeyman is a film adaptation of Stephen King's 1973 short story of the same name. On June 26, 2018, it was announced filmmaking partners Scott Beck and Bryan Woods would write the screenplay with Shawn Levy, Dan Levine, and Dan Cohen attached to produce for 21 Laps Entertainment and 20th Century Fox set to distribute. However, in 2019, after Disney's acquisition of Fox, the film was canceled, along with other films in development. In November 2021, the film was revived, and it was reported that Rob Savage would direct from a screenplay by Mark Heyman, based on original drafts by Beck, Woods, and Akela Cooper with streaming service Hulu set to distribute. In early 2022, Sophie Thatcher, Chris Messina, David Dastmalchian, Marin Ireland, Vivien Lyra Blair, Madison Hu, and Jaynie Verdin were added to the cast. Principal photography began in February 2022 in New Orleans. Patrick Jonsson composed the film's score.

Release
The film is scheduled to be released in the United States on June 2, 2023, by 20th Century Studios. It was originally planned to be released on Hulu in 2023, however, following a positive test screening in December, it was announced that it would be switched to release theatrically on its June 2 date. King announced via Twitter that the trailer would be released on January 29, 2023, during the NFC Championship Game.

References

External links
 

2023 films
2023 horror films
2020s American films
2020s English-language films
2020s monster movies
20th Century Studios films
21 Laps Entertainment films
American horror films
Films about grieving
Films based on American short stories
Films based on works by Stephen King
Films shot in New Orleans
Upcoming English-language films